Free Love may refer to:

Free love, a social movement that rejects marriage, which is seen as a form of social bondage, especially for women
Free Love (film), a 1930 film starring Conrad Nagel
Free Love (album), an album by Sylvan Esso
"Free Love", a song by Morphine from their 1995 album Yes
"Free Love", a short story by Ali Smith, part of her book of short stories, "Free Love and Other Stories"
"Free Love", a song by Cage the Elephant from their self-titled debut album